Asen Vasiliev Petrov (Асен Василиев; June 2, 1900, Kyustendil - June 21, 1981, Sofia) was a Bulgarian art critic and artist, professor and honorary citizen of Kyustendil. 

Member of the Union of Bulgarian Artists. Avatar for the creation of the first Bulgarian regional and local lore encyclopedia of his native Kyustendil region. 

Positivist and the greatest researcher of the art of the Bulgarian Revival and in the Balkans in general with his book "Bulgarian Revival Masters". A close friend of Vladimir Dimitrov.

One of the initiators for the celebration of the 1300th Anniversary of the Bulgarian State.

References

Members of the Bulgarian Academy of Sciences
1900 births
1981 deaths
20th-century Bulgarian painters
20th-century male artists
People from Kyustendil
Bulgarian art historians
Bulgarian art critics
Cultural academics
Historiography of Bulgaria
Male painters